Saint-Laurent-Lolmie (Languedocien: Sent Laurenç de l'Òrmia) is a former commune in the Lot department in south-western France. On 1 January 2018, it was merged into the new commune of Lendou-en-Quercy. Its population was 179 in 2019.

Originally known simply as Saint-Laurent, the commune was renamed Saint-Laurent-Lolmie by a decree dated December 25, 1918.

Geography 
Saint-Laurent and Lolmie are two different places a mile apart, and linked by the Lendou valley.

See also
Communes of the Lot department

References

Saintlaurentlolmie
Lendou-en-Quercy